Andi Meister (born 17 November 1938 in Lüganuse) is an Estonian road engineer and politician.

In 1992–1995 he was Minister of Roads and Communications.

References

Living people
1938 births
Estonian engineers
Estonian National Independence Party politicians
Government ministers of Estonia
Tallinn University of Technology alumni
People from Lüganuse Parish